In organic chemistry, hydroboration refers to the addition of a hydrogen-boron bond to certain double and triple bonds involving carbon (and ). This chemical reaction is useful in the organic synthesis of organic compounds. 

Hydroboration produces organoborane compounds that react with a variety of reagents to produce useful compounds, such as alcohols, amines, or alkyl halides. The most widely known reaction of the organoboranes is oxidation to produce alcohols typically by hydrogen peroxide. This type of reaction has promoted research on hydroboration because of its mild condition and a wide scope of tolerated alkenes. Another research subtheme is metal-catalysed hydroboration.

The development of this technology and the underlying concepts were recognized by the Nobel Prize in Chemistry to Herbert C. Brown. He shared the prize with Georg Wittig in 1979 for his pioneering research on organoboranes as important synthetic intermediates.

Addition of a H-B bond to C-C double bonds
Hydroboration is typically anti-Markovnikov, i.e. the hydrogen adds to the most substituted carbon of the double bond. That the regiochemistry is reverse of a typical HX addition reflects the polarity of the Bδ+-Hδ− bonds. Hydroboration proceeds via a four-membered transition state:  the hydrogen and the boron atoms added on the same face of the double bond. Granted that the mechanism is concerted, the formation of the C-B bond proceeds slightly faster than the formation of the C-H bond. As a result, in the transition state, boron develops a partially negative charge while the more substituted carbon bears a partially positive charge. This partial positive charge is better supported by the more substituted carbon.  Formally, the reaction is an example of a group transfer reaction.  However, an analysis of the orbitals involved reveals that the reaction is 'pseudopericyclic' and not subject to the Woodward–Hoffmann rules for pericyclic reactivity. 

If BH3 is used as the hydroborating reagent, reactions typically proceed beyond the monoalkyl borane compounds, especially for less sterically hindered small olefins. Trisubstituted olefins can rapidly produce dialkyl boranes, but further alkylation of the organoboranes is slowed because of steric hindrance. This significant rate difference in producing di- and tri-alkyl boranes is useful in the synthesis of bulky boranes that can enhance regioselectivity (see below).

Reactions involving substituted alkenes
For trisubstituted alkenes such as 1, boron is predominantly placed on the less substituted carbon. The minor product, in which the boron atom is placed on the more substituted carbon, is usually produced in less than 10%. A notable case with lower regioselectivity is styrene, and the selectivity is strongly influenced by the substituent on the para position.

Hydroboration of 1,2-disubstituted alkenes, such as a cis or trans olefin, produces generally a mixture of the two organoboranes of comparable amounts, even if the substituents are very different in terms of steric bulk. For such 1,2-disubstituted olefins, regioselectivity can be observed only when one of the two substituents is a phenyl ring. In such cases, such as trans-1-phenylpropene, the boron atom is placed on the carbon adjacent to the phenyl ring. The observations above indicate that the addition of H-B bond to olefins is under electronic control rather than steric control.

Reactions of organoboranes

The C-B bonds generated by hydroboration are reactive with various reagents, the most common one being hydrogen peroxide. Because the addition of H-B to olefins is stereospecific, this oxidation reaction will be diastereoselective when the alkene is trisubstituted. Hydroboration-oxidation is thus an excellent way of producing alcohols in a stereospecific and anti-Markovnikov fashion.

Hydroboration can also lead to amines by treating the intermediate organoboranes with monochloramine or O-hydroxylaminesulfonic acid (HSA).

Terminal olefins are converted to the corresponding alkyl bromides and alkyl iodides by treating the organoborane intermediates with bromine or iodine. Such reactions have not however proven very popular, because succinimide based reagents such as NIS and NBS are more versatile and do not require rigorous conditions as do organoboranes.
etc.

Borane adducts

Diborane can be produced in situ by reduction BF3 with NaBH4 (see for Flavopiridol). Usually however, borane dimethylsulfide complex BH3S(CH3)2 (BMS) is used as a source of BH3. It can be obtained in highly concentrated forms. 

The adduct BH3(THF) is also commercially available as THF solutions wherein it exists as the 1:1 adduct.  It degrades with time. 

Borane adducts with phosphines and amines are also available, but are not widely used. Borane makes a strong adduct with triethylamine; using this adduct requires harsher conditions in hydroboration. This can be advantageous for cases such as hydroborating trienes to avoid polymerization. More sterically hindered tertiary and silyl amines can deliver borane to alkenes at room temperature.

Monosubstituted boranes
 
Monoalkyl boranes are relatively rare. When the alkyl group is small, such as methyl, the monoalkylboranes tend to redistribute to give mixtures of diborane and di- and trialkylboranes.  Monoalkylboranes typically exist as dimers of the form [RBH2]2. One example is thexylborane (ThxBH2), produced by the hydroboration of tetramethylethylene:
B2H6 + 2 Me2C=CMe2 →  [Me2CHCMe2BH2]2
A chiral example is monoisopinocampheylborane. Although often written as IpcBH2, it is a dimer [IpcBH2]2. It is obtained by hydroboration of (−)‐α‐pinene with borane dimethyl sulfide.

Species of the form RBH2 are available for R = alkyl and halide. Monobromo- and monochloro-borane can be prepared from BMS and the corresponding boron trihalides. The stable complex of monochloroborane and 1,4-dioxane effects hydroboration of terminal alkenes.

Disubstituted boranes

Dimesitylborane
dimesitylborane is a dimer (C6H2Me3)2B2H2). It reacts only slowly with simple terminal alkenes. On the other hand, alkynes undergo monohydroboration with Mes2BH easily to produce alkenylboranes.

Disiamylborane
Among hindered dialkylboranes is disiamylborane, abbreviated Sia2BH.  It also is a dimer. Owing to its steric bulk, it selectively hydroborates less hindered, usually terminal alkenes in the presence of more substituted alkenes. Disiamylborane must be freshly prepared as its solutions can only be stored at 0 °C for a few hours. Dicyclohexylborane Chx2BH exhibits improved thermal stability than Sia2BH.

9-BBN
A versatile dialkylborane is 9-BBN. Also called "banana borane", it exists as a dimer. It can be distilled without decomposition at 195 °C (12mm Hg). Reactions with 9-BBN typically occur at 60–80 °C, with most alkenes reacting within one hour. Tetrasubstituted alkenes add 9-BBN at elevated temperature. Hydroboration of alkenes with 9-BBN proceeds with excellent regioselectivity. It is more sensitive to steric differences than Sia2BH, perhaps because of it rigid C8 backbone. 9-BBN is more reactive towards alkenes than alkynes.

Other secondary boranes
Simple, unhindered dialkylboranes are reactive at room temperature towards most alkenes and terminal alkynes but are difficult to prepare in high purity, since they exist in equilibrium with mono- and trialkylboranes. One common way of preparing them is the reduction of dialkylhalogenoboranes with metal hydrides. An important synthetic application using such dialkylboranes, such as diethylborane, is the transmetallation of the organoboron compounds to form organozinc compounds.

Pinacolborane and catecholborane
For catalytic hydroboration, pinacolborane and catecholborane are widely used. They also exhibit higher reactivity toward alkynes. Pinacolborane is also widely used in a catalyst-free hydroborations.

See also
 Hydroboration–oxidation reaction

References 

Organic reactions